Hugh Renton (born 12 May 1996) is a New Zealand rugby union player who currently plays for  in the Bunnings NPC and the  in Super Rugby.

Early career
Born and raised in Hastings, Renton attended Lindisfarne College, close to his hometown, where he was head boy in 2014. Renton played for the school's top side in 2012 and 2013, but was unable to play his senior year because of a nerve injury.

Super Rugby
Renton played under-18 rugby for the Hurricanes in 2013 as a year-12 student and captained them against the Chiefs under-18, winning 40–10.
He made no appearances during the 2015 campaign, but was a part of the Hurricanes squad for the 2016 season, in which the team was crowned Super Rugby champions for the first time. Despite coming back from injury and the campaign being a successful one for the franchise, it was one of personal disappointment for Renton, as injury ruined his year and he again failed to make the field.

The 2017 Super Rugby season saw Renton performing well throughout pre season. However he had to wait until round 13 against the Cheetahs to make his debut as regular Callum Gibbins pulled out late with injury. Renton came on as a replacement for Ardie Savea in the last quarter of the match, the Hurricanes went on to win 61–7. Gibbins returned to the squad the following week, which meant that was the only game time Renton saw in 2017 as the Hurricanes lost to the Lions in the semi final 44–29. Despite having a promising Mitre 10 Cup for the Hawke's Bay Magpies and it being the first time he had played consistently without injury, Renton was not wanted in 2018 with the Hurricanes signing fellow Magpie Gareth Evans.

Bunnings NPC
Renton played no rugby in 2015 due to an injury sustained in 2013. He played four times in 2016, twice as a starting player and twice coming on as a substitute, with continued injury hampering his 2016. In 2017, Renton played every game for the Magpies. In September 2020 Renton was named in the Tasman Mako squad for the 2020 Mitre 10 Cup. Renton played 11 games for the Mako in the 2020 season as they won their second premiership title in a row. Renton was part of the side as they made the premiership again during the 2021 Bunnings NPC, this time losing to  23–20.

References

1996 births
Living people
Canterbury rugby union players
Hawke's Bay rugby union players
Highlanders (rugby union) players
Hurricanes (rugby union) players
New Zealand rugby union players
People educated at Lindisfarne College, New Zealand
Rugby union flankers
Rugby union players from Hastings, New Zealand
Tasman rugby union players